The Dubai Waterfront (now known as Waterfront) was expected to become the largest waterfront and largest man-made development in the world.  The project is a conglomeration of canals and artificial archipelago; it would occupy the last remaining Persian Gulf coastline of Dubai, the most populous emirate of the United Arab Emirates.  It was planned to consist of a series of zones with mixed use including commercial, residential, resort, and amenity areas.  The vision of the project is "to create a world-class destination for residents, visitors and businesses in the world's fastest growing city".

Run by the Dubai Waterfront Company, the project is open to foreign investment with its real estate developer, Nakheel, owning a 51% stake.

Waterfront was being developed by Nakheel, one of the world's largest real estate developers. There is, however, a major issue with erosion. The artificial islands would be formed to resemble the most widely recognized symbol of Islam, the star and crescent. This would produce a shelter around the Palm Jebel Ali, one of the two Palm Islands, the largest artificial islands (shaped like palm trees) in the world also being constructed by Nakheel.

Geography
It is expected to house an estimated population of 1.5 million people.

Located near the new Al Maktoum International Airport, and with direct access to Sheikh Zayed Road, Jebel Ali Freezone, and Abu Dhabi, the city would be fully accessible on a local and international scale.

The hub of the development would be along the shoreline, stretching in-land to offer a range of residences, commercial districts and industrial areas, with a number of major tourist attractions and leisure amenities. Extending from the coastline into the Persian Gulf would be a series of connected islands featuring villas and high-end accommodation.

Sections
The plan consists of 10 key areas including Madinat Al Arab, expected to become the new downtown and central business district of Dubai.  Madinat Al Arab was developed by an international consortium of architects, planners and urban developers featuring resorts, retail, commercial spaces, public spaces, a broad mix of residencies and an integrated transport system including light rail and a road network.

Other key zones include Al Ras, Corniche, The Riviera, The Palm Boulevard, The Peninsula, Uptown, Downtown, Boulevard, and The Exchange.

History
Major civil works and infrastructure commenced on the first phase of Madinat Al Arab. Construction of the 8.0 kilometer Palm Cove Canal, which runs parallel to the coastline, began in February 2007 and was more than 65 per cent complete before the project was suspended.

The first phase of Madinat Al Arab (30%) was unveiled to private property and investment institutions from the United Arab Emirates and Cooperation Council for the Arab States of the Gulf in July 2005.  Within five days, it had been completely sold out, for over 13 billion AED.

Suspension
The Waterfront project stalled with the onset of the global financial crisis and Dubai World's debt crisis in 2009. Nakheel was forced to restructure over $11bn of debt and scale back many of its projects. In December 2011 Nakheel advertised for sale 13 unused construction cranes intended for use in the Waterfront project. Nakheel has announced its intention to develop the first phase of the Veneto and Badrah neighbourhoods and associated infrastructure of certain phases of the Madinat Al Arab in the near-term, while other parts of the waterfront have been suspended until demand improves.

See also
Dubai Marina
Tourism in Dubai
The World
The Universe
Arabian Canal

References

External links
Dubai Waterfront pictures

Nakheel Properties
Buildings and structures under construction in Dubai
Artificial islands of Dubai